Puerto Rico competed at the 2011 Pan American Games in Guadalajara, Mexico from October 14 to 30, 2011. Puerto Rico sent 250 athletes in 30 sports.  It was the most successful Panamerican games for Puerto Rico, going from a maximum of three gold medals to winning six in these games.

Medalists

Archery

Puerto Rico has qualified one male and three female athletes in the archery competition.

Men

Women

Athletics

Men
Track and road events

Field events

Combined events

Women
Track and road events

Field events

Badminton

Puerto Rico has qualified one male and one female athletes in the badminton competition.

Men

Women

Mixed

Baseball

Puerto Rico has qualified a baseball team of twenty athletes to participate.

Team

Hiram Bocachica
Antonio Candelaria
César Crespo
José De La Torre
Juan Díaz
Jeffry Dominguez
Jesús Feliciano
Luis Figueroa
Adalberto Flores
Nelvin Fuentes
Reymond Fuentes
Iván Maldonado
Miguel Mejías
Efrain Nieves
Wilberto Ortiz
Juan Miguel Padilla
Julio Rodríguez
Andrès Santiago
Tomás Santiago
Neftalí Soto
Yariel Soto
Joseph Torres
José Valentín
Christian Vázquez

Standings

Results

Seventh place match

Basketball

Men

Team

Carlos Arroyo
Renaldo Balkman
José Juan Barea
Miguel Berdiel
Gabriel Colon
Manuel De Jesus
Manuel Narvaez
Filiberto Rivera
Daniel Santiago
Carlos Strong
Edwin Ubiles
Luis Villafañe

Standings

Results

Semifinals

Finals

Women

Team

Carla Cortijo
Carla Escalera
Sandra García
Yolanda Jones
Angiely Morales
Michelle Pacheco
Mari Placido
Pamela Rosado
Stephanie Rosado
Jazmine Sepulveda
Cynthia Valentin
Esmary Vargas

Standings

Results

Semifinals

Finals

Beach volleyball

Puerto Rico has qualified a men's team and women's team in the beach volleyball competition.

Bowling

Puerto Rico has qualified two male and two female athletes in the bowling competition.

Men
Individual

Pairs

Women
Individual

Pairs

Boxing

Puerto Rico has qualified six boxers.

Men

Women

Canoeing

Men

Women

Cycling

Mountain Biking
Men

Cycling BMX

Diving

Men

Women

Equestrian

Dressage

Eventing

Individual jumping

Fencing

Puerto Rico has qualified one male and two female athletes in the foil competition and one female athlete in the sabre competition.

Men

Women

Gymnastics

Artistic
Puerto Rico has qualified six male and two female gymnasts in the artistic gymnastics competition.

Men
Individual qualification & Team Finals

Individual Finals

Women
Individual qualification & Team Finals

Individual Finals

Trampoline

Men

Handball

Women

Team

Adriana Cabrera
Roxanaly Carrasquillo
Natalys Ceballo
Jerellyn Diaz
Crystall Escalera
Kitsa Escobar
Ciris Garcia
Jackeline Gonzalez
Sheila Hiraldo
Jailene Maldonando
Fabiola Martinez
Jenipher Melendez
Lillianoska Natal
Lizabeth Rodriguez
Natalia Santos

Standings

Results

Fifth-eighth place matches

Fifth place match

Judo

Puerto Rico has qualified three athletes in the 90 kg, 100 kg, and 100+kg men's categories and three athletes in the 63 kg, 70 kg, and 78+kg women's categories.

Men

Repechage Rounds

Women

Repechage Rounds

Karate

Puerto Rico has qualified one athlete in the 84+kg men's category and one athlete in the 68+kg women's category.

Roller skating

Men

Women
Artistic

Sailing

Puerto Rico has qualified four boats and six athletes in the sailing competition.

Men

Open

Shooting

Puerto Rico has qualified eleven quotas and eight athletes in the shooting competition.

Men

Women

Softball

Puerto Rico has qualified a team to participate. The team will be made up of 17 athletes.

Team

Gabriela Andino
Lisandra Berrios
Izmena Cabrera
Kaylyn Camacho
Lisaira Daniels
Shirley Daniels
Aisha Figueroa
Lissette Garay
Nicollette Levine
Aleimalee Lopez
Zomarie Lozano
Rachel Martinez
Jessica Melendez
Kiara Nazario
Nicole Osterman
Laura Ramos
Monica Santos

Standings

Results

Swimming

Men

Women

Table tennis

Puerto Rico has qualified three female athletes to compete in the individual table tennis competition.

Women

Taekwondo

Puerto Rico has qualified six athletes (two male and four female).

Men

Women

Tennis

Men

Women

Mixed

Triathlon

Men

Women

Volleyball

Men

Team

Gregory Berrios
Enrique Escalante
Juan Figueroa
Jonathan King
Fernando Morales
Roberto Muñiz
Jean Ortíz
Ángel Pérez
Víctor Rivera
Sequiel Sánchez
Pedrito Sierra
Héctor Soto

Standings

Results

Quarterfinals

Fifth to eighth place classification

Seventh place match

Women

Team

Sarai Álvarez
Áurea Cruz
Stephanie Enright
Shirley Ferrer
Vilmary Mojica
Lynda Morales
Michelle Nogueras
Diana Reyes
Yarimar Rosa
Daly Santana
Amanda Vázquez
Shara Venegas

Standings

Results

Quarterfinals

Fifth to eighth place classification;

Fifth place match

Water polo

Puerto Rico has qualified a women's team.

Women

Team

Angelica Garcia
Estefania Laboy
Reina Lopez
Caroline Matos
Paola Medina
Alejandra Ortiz
Amanda Ortiz

Angelica Ortiz
Cristina Ortiz
Osmarie Quinones
Anaid Ralat
Mairim Rosario
Francheska Salib

Standings

Elimination stage
Crossover

Fifth place match

Weightlifting

Wrestling

Puerto Rico has qualified four athletes in the 60 kg, 84 kg, 96 kg, and 120 kg in the men's freestyle categories, two athletes in the 60 kg and 74 kg men's Greco-Roman categories, and three athletes in the 48 kg, 55 kg, and 72 kg women's freestyle categories.

Men
Freestyle

Greco-Roman

Women
Freestyle

References

Nations at the 2011 Pan American Games
P
2011